Cowie Bridge is a roadway bridge which carries the B979 across the mouth of the Cowie Water in Stonehaven, Aberdeenshire, Scotland.  

Historically, the area in the vicinity of the Cowie Bridge site has been an old fishing village known as Cowie Village.  Between the Cowie Bridge and the North Sea, a new pedestrian bridge is planned, which will also support a new pipeline structure.  The site of Cowie Bridge is approximately the point of the southern terminus of the Causey Mounth trackway, which was the only available medieval route crossing the coastal Grampian Mountains northerly by way of Muchalls Castle and Gillybrands.

See also
Cowie Castle
Chapel of St. Mary and St. Nathalan

References

Category B listed buildings in Aberdeenshire
Bridges in Aberdeenshire
Stonehaven